Gamewell may refer to:

People
 Francis Dunlap Gamewell (1857–1950), American missionary in China
 Mary Ninde Gamewell (1858–1947), American missionary in China; writer
 Mary Porter Gamewell (1848–1906), American missionary in China
 John Gamewell, American inventor

Places
 Gamewell, North Carolina, U.S.